Zaland ( dzalānd) is a Pashtun name meaning "bright" or "glowing". This name is also common among the non-Pashtuns of Afghanistan, including the Tajiks.

People with the surname
Jalil Zaland, Afghan singer
Soheila Zaland, Afghan singer

Iranian-language surnames